Locust Hill may refer to the following places in the U.S. state of Virginia:

Locust Hill, Middlesex County, Virginia
Locust Hill, Prince William County, Virginia
Locust Hill, Wythe County, Virginia